Klášterská Lhota is a municipality and village in Trutnov District in the Hradec Králové Region of the Czech Republic. It has about 200 inhabitants.

Sights
The most notable monument is the Chapel of the Holy Trinity. This Empire style chapel was built in 1825 and the timber-framed part was added in 1903.

References

Villages in Trutnov District